The Buffalo Dance, or Bison Dance, is an annual dance festival of many North American Plains Natives, including the Mandan, Sioux, Cheyenne, Pawnee, and Omaha, among others. The festival traditionally coincided with the return of the buffalo herds, and included a feast and a dance with a number of men wearing buffalo and other animal skins.

As the buffalo, or bison, was so central to society, it was important to assure the return of the herd and an abundance of food and resources.

A short, 16-second, black-and-white silent 1894 film Buffalo Dance shows people performing the dance. It is notable for being one of the earliest films made featuring Native Americans.

The Buffalo Dance can also refer to section of larger ceremonies and dances, such as the Sun Dance. In some societies it was also a dance more associated with curing the ill, calling on the spirit of the buffalo.

References

Notes

Bibliography
 Laubin, Reginald and Gladys. Indian Dances of North America: Their Importance to Indian Life. University of Oklahoma Press, 1977.
 Spence, Lewis. Myths of the North American Indians. Gramercy Books, 1994. New York. .
 Stands In Timber, John and Liberty, Margot. Cheyenne Memories University of Nebraska Press, 1972. 
 Walker, J. R. "The Sun Dance and Other Ceremonies of the Oglala Division of the Teton Dakota". Anthropological papers of the American Museum of Natural History, Volume 16, Part 2. American Museum of Natural History, 1916. New York.
 Wissler, Clark. "Societies of the Plains Indians". Anthropological papers of the American Museum of Natural History, Volume 11. American Museum of Natural History, 1916. New York.

Native American dances
Indigenous culture of the Great Plains
Bison
Ritual dances